Joantony Xavier Carmona Sarache (born 27 May 2001) is a Venezuelan footballer who plays as a left winger for Monagas.

Club career

Trujillanos
Carmona was born and raised in a small neighborhood called El Milagro in Valera, Trujillo. He started playing futsal at the age of five and later joined Trujillanos.

Carmona got his official and professional debut for Trujillanos on 31 March 2019 at the age of 17 against Atlético Venezuela, when he came in as a substitute for Yohanner García in the 34th minute. He scored his first goal in his fourth league appearance for the club and ended the season with 18 games played. In the 2020 season, Carmona became a key player for Trujillanos with 18 league appearances and five goals.

Brazil
In the beginning of May 2021 it was confirmed, that Carmona had joined Brazilian club Atlético Mineiro, where he would play for the U-20 team.

However, before even playing for his new club, he left again and instead signed with Athletico Paranaense on 29 June 2021, where he also would be a part of the U-20 team.

Return to Venezuela
In March 2022, Carmona returned to Venezuela, when he signed with Monagas.

References

External links
 

Living people
2001 births
Association football wingers
Venezuelan footballers
Venezuelan expatriate footballers
People from Valera
Venezuelan Primera División players
Trujillanos FC players
Clube Atlético Mineiro players
Club Athletico Paranaense players
Monagas S.C. players
Venezuelan expatriate sportspeople in Brazil
Expatriate footballers in Brazil
21st-century Venezuelan people